Dakhkat is a village in Sughd Region, northern Tajikistan. It is part of the jamoat Rosrovut in Devashtich District.

References

Populated places in Sughd Region